The 2015 World Table Tennis Championships women's doubles was the 52nd edition of the women's doubles championship. Guo Yue and Li Xiaoxia were the defending champions.

Liu Shiwen and Zhu Yuling won the title by defeating Ding Ning and Li Xiaoxia 8–11, 11–8, 3–11, 11–8, 11–13, 11–8, 11–8 in the final.

Seeds
Matches will be best of 5 games in qualification and best of 7 games in the 64-player sized main draw.

  Ai Fukuhara /  Misako Wakamiya (quarterfinals)
  Feng Tianwei /  Yu Mengyu (semifinals)
  Liu Shiwen /  Zhu Yuling (champion)
  Miu Hirano /  Mima Ito (second round)
  Katarzyna Grzybowska /  Natalia Partyka (third round)
  Doo Hoi Kem /  Lee Ho Ching (third round)
  Ding Ning /  Li Xiaoxia (final)
  Park Young-sook /  Yang Ha-eun (quarterfinals)
  Jiang Huajun /  Tie Ya Na (third round)
  Nina Mittelham /  Petrissa Solja (third round)
  Nadeen El-Dawlatly /  Dina Meshref (first round)
  Liu Jia /  Iveta Vacenovská (third round)
  Han Xing /  Onyinyechi Nwachukwu (second round)
  Kristin Silbereisen /  Sabine Winter (third round)
  Cheng I-ching /  Lee I-chen (quarterfinals)
  Maria Dolgikh /  Polina Mikhailova (third round)
  Kim Hye-song/ Kim Jong (third round)
  Chen Szu-yu /  Liu Hsing-yin (second round)
  Adriana Diaz /  Melanie Diaz (second round)
  Matilda Ekholm /  Lea Rakovac (second round)
  Szandra Pergel /  Elizabeta Samara (first round)
  Galia Dvorak /  Sara Ramírez (second round)
  Kateřina Pěnkavová /  Renáta Štrbíková (second round)
  Camila Arguelles /  Ana Codina (first round)
  Natalia Castellano /  Paulina Vega (second round)
  Nanthana Komwong /  Li Xiaodan (second round)
  Gui Lin /  Caroline Kumahara (second round)
  Melek Hu /  Shen Yanfei (quarterfinals)
  Tetyana Sorochynska /  Ganna Gaponova (second round)
  Yana Noskova /  Yulia Prokhorova (second round)
  Carole Grundisch /  Xian Yifang (first round)
  Camelia Postoaca /  Bernadette Szőcs (first round)

Draw

Finals

Top half

Section 1

Section 2

Bottom half

Section 3

Section 4

References

External links
Main Draw
Qualifying Draw

Women's doubles
World